Hortensius, Friend of Nero is a 1936 novel by Edith Pargeter. In it, Hortensius attempts to save the Christian wife of a friend in the arena, an act for which he is forced to flee by Nero, along with a Persian slave whom he falls for. It was Pargeter's first historical novel.

References

1936 novels
Novels set in ancient Rome